Valter Flego (born 15 August 1972) is a Croatian politician who has been a Member of the European Parliament for Croatia since 2 July 2019. Previously he had served as the 4th prefect of Istria County from 2013 to 2019, as well as he served three terms as mayor of the town of Buzet. He is a member of the liberal Istrian Democratic Assembly (IDS) party.

Early life and education
He finished elementary school and first two years of high school in Buzet, and 3rd and 4th grade in Rijeka. After graduation he gained qualification of a machine technician. In 1991 he enrolled in the study of mechanical engineering on the University of Rijeka, where he graduated in 1996 with special honors and became a mechanical engineer. During his studies he received Rector's Award of the University of Rijeka as the best student of the Technical Faculty as well as Truffle Award for Excellence in curricular and extracurricular activities from the town of Buzet.

Career
After finishing studies, Flego got a job in the company Istrian waterworks, and in the same time enrolled in the postgraduate studies on the Rijeka Faculty of Economics which he finished in year 2000 acquiring a scientific master's degree in economics.

After 2001 local elections Flego became the Mayor of Buzet. After 2005 local elections he was unanimously re-elected mayor by the city council. At the first direct local elections that were held in 2009 Flego received over 84% of the voters, thus achieving the best result out of all candidates for mayor in Croatia.

In 2013 local elections Flego, who had support from IDS-HNS-LD-Green party, ran against Damir Kajin, who had support of SDP-HSU-SDSS-HSLS, for the position of Prefect of Istrian county. Eventually he won with 47,25% to 36,24% of votes.

Personal life
Flego is married since 2002 to Branka Flego, an elementary school teacher. They have two sons, Dinko and Ivo.

References

MEPs for Croatia 2019–2024
1972 births
Living people
Politicians from Koper
People from Buzet
University of Rijeka alumni
Mayors of places in Croatia
Istrian Democratic Assembly politicians